Stodůlky is a Prague Metro station on Line B, located in Stodůlky, Prague 13. The station was opened on 11 November 1994 as part of the extension of Line B from Nové Butovice to Zličín.

Photogallery

References

Prague Metro stations
Railway stations opened in 1994
1994 establishments in the Czech Republic
Railway stations in the Czech Republic opened in the 20th century